Lindackeria is a genus of flowering plants belonging to the family Achariaceae.

Its native range is south-eastern Mexico to southern Tropical America and Tropical Africa. It is found in the countries of Angola, Belize, Benin, Bolivia, Brazil, Burundi, Cabinda, Cameroon, Central African Republic, Colombia, Congo, Costa Rica, Ecuador, Gabon, Ghana, Guatemala, Guinea, Guyana, Ivory Coast, Kenya, Liberia, Malawi, Mexico, Nicaragua, Nigeria, Peru, Rwanda, Sierra Leone, Somalia, Sudan, Tanzania, Togo, Uganda, Zambia and Zaïre.

The genus name of Lindackeria is in honour of Johann Thaddaeus Lindacker (1768–1816), Bohemian mineralogist from Banská Štiavnica, who collected plants for his herbarium. It was first described and published in Reliq. Haenk. Vol.2 on page 89 in 1835.

Known species
According to Kew:
Lindackeria bukobensis 
Lindackeria cuneatoacuminata 
Lindackeria dentata 
Lindackeria fragrans 
Lindackeria latifolia 
Lindackeria laurina 
Lindackeria ngounyensis 
Lindackeria ovata 
Lindackeria paludosa 
Lindackeria paraensis 
Lindackeria pauciflora 
Lindackeria poggei 
Lindackeria schweinfurthii 
Lindackeria stipulata

References

Achariaceae
Malpighiales genera
Plants described in 1835